Pro Pinball: The Web (Pro Pinball in North America) is a pinball simulation video game developed by Cunning Developments for PlayStation, MS-DOS, Windows 95 and Sega Saturn. It is the first game in the Pro Pinball series.

Background
Pro Pinball: The Web uses graphics pre-rendered from an intricate 3D model. Consequently, the game had superior graphical capabilities to other popular pinball games of the time, while playing at full speed on MS-DOS. The Web supports screen resolutions up to 1024x768 with 32,768 colours, and features Red Book CD-DA audio tracks.

Gameplay

Pro Pinball: The Web is a pinball simulation in which players operate a virtual pinball table. Players can score extra points by making combos, i.e. performing a move twice in a row. Hitting targets at the far end of the table activates the game's missions, in which the player must hit lighted ramps or bumpers to score bonus points. Completing a mission results in a huge point bonus.

Reception

The PlayStation and Saturn versions received mixed reviews. While critics praised the realistic pinball graphics and physics and the wide variety of scoring opportunities, they criticized the voice samples and the absence of a directly overhead view. Some also concluded that with only one table, the game would get old very quickly, though a reviewer for Next Generation remarked, "While many developers have tried to wow gamers with multiple tables, Empire went the other way - giving the player one table, but doing it right." Jeff Gerstmann of GameSpot concluded that it "is a convincing simulation of pinball, but it falls short when compared to other video pinball games." Rob Allsetter of Sega Saturn Magazine assessed that "All in all, this is a decent enough interpretation of the game itself, let down only by the exclusion of different table to variate the action a little", and Dan Hsu of Electronic Gaming Monthly said, "It's a great board, but it'll get old real quick."

Reviewing the PC version, Tim Soete highly praised the game's realism and summarized that "its high-resolution graphics and true table physics combine to make it one of the most immersive pinball titles out there."

The Web was named the 64th best computer game ever by PC Gamer UK in 1997. The editors wrote, "Nothing else has quite come close [...] to Pro Pinballs utterly convincing physics and slick presentation."

References

External links
 
 Pro Pinball - The Web (Wayback Machine)

1996 video games
Action video games
DOS games
Classic Mac OS games
Pinball video games
PlayStation (console) games
Sega Saturn games
Video games developed in the United Kingdom
Windows games
Empire Interactive games
Multiplayer and single-player video games
Cunning Developments games